George Fox (July 1624 – 13 January 1691) was an English Dissenter, who was a founder of the Religious Society of Friends, commonly known as the Quakers or Friends. The son of a Leicestershire weaver, he lived in times of social upheaval and war. He rebelled against the religious and political authorities by proposing an unusual, uncompromising approach to the Christian faith. He travelled throughout Britain as a dissenting preacher, performed hundreds of healings, and was often persecuted by the disapproving authorities. In 1669, he married Margaret Fell, widow of a wealthy supporter, Thomas Fell; she was a leading Friend. His ministry expanded and he made tours of North America and the Low Countries. He was arrested and jailed numerous times for his beliefs. He spent his final decade working in London to organise the expanding Quaker movement. Despite disdain from some Anglicans and Puritans, he was viewed with respect by the Quaker convert William Penn and the Lord Protector, Oliver Cromwell.

Early life

George Fox was born in the strongly Puritan village of Drayton-in-the-Clay, Leicestershire, England (now Fenny Drayton), 15 miles (24 km) west-south-west of Leicester, as the eldest of four children of Christopher Fox, a successful weaver, called "Righteous Christer" by his neighbours, and his wife, Mary née Lago. Christopher Fox was a churchwarden and relatively wealthy. He left his son a substantial legacy when he died in the late 1650s. Fox was of a serious, religious disposition from childhood. There is no record of any formal schooling but he learnt to read and write. "When I came to eleven years of age," he said, "I knew pureness and righteousness; for, while I was a child, I was taught how to walk to be kept pure. The Lord taught me to be faithful, in all things, and to act faithfully two ways; viz., inwardly to God, and outwardly to man." Known as an honest person, he also proclaimed, "The Lord taught me to be faithful in all things ... and to keep to Yea and Nay in all things."

As he grew up, Fox's relatives "thought to have made me a priest" but he was instead apprenticed to a local shoemaker and grazier, George Gee of Mancetter. This suited his contemplative temperament and he became well known for his diligence among the wool traders who had dealings with his master. A constant obsession for Fox was the pursuit of "simplicity" in life – humility and the abandonment of luxury. The short time he spent as a shepherd was important to the formation of this view. Toward the end of his life he wrote a letter for general circulation pointing out that Abel, Noah, Abraham, Jacob, Moses and David were all keepers of sheep or cattle and so a learned education should not be seen as a necessary qualification for ministry.

George Fox knew people who were "professors" (followers of the standard Church of England), but by the age of 19 he was looking down on their behaviour, in particular their consumption of alcohol. At prayer one night after leaving two acquaintances at a drinking session, Fox heard an inner voice saying, "Thou seest how young people go together into vanity, and old people into the earth; thou must forsake all, young and old, keep out of all, and be as a stranger unto all."

First travels
Driven by his "inner voice", Fox left Drayton-in-the-Clay in September 1643 and moved towards London in a state of mental torment and confusion. The English Civil War had begun and troops were stationed in many towns through which he passed. In Barnet, he was torn by depression (perhaps from the temptations of the resort town near London). He alternately shut himself in his room for days at a time or went out alone into the countryside. After almost a year he returned to Drayton, where he engaged Nathaniel Stephens, the clergyman of his home town, in long discussions on religious matters. Stephens considered Fox a gifted young man, but the two disagreed on so many issues that he later called Fox mad and spoke against him.

Over the next few years Fox continued to travel around the country, as his particular religious beliefs took shape. At times he actively sought the company of clergy, but found no comfort from them as they seemed unable to help with the matters troubling him. One, in Warwickshire, advised him to take tobacco (which Fox disliked) and sing psalms; another, in Coventry, lost his temper when Fox accidentally stood on a flower in his garden; a third suggested bloodletting. Fox became fascinated by the Bible, which he studied assiduously. He hoped to find among the "English Dissenters" a spiritual understanding absent from the established church, but he fell out with one group, for example, because he maintained that women had souls:

He thought intensely about the Temptation of Christ, which he compared to his own spiritual condition, but he drew strength from his conviction that God would support and preserve him. In prayer and meditation he came to a greater understanding of the nature of his faith and what it required from him; this process he called "opening". He also came to what he deemed a deep inner understanding of standard Christian beliefs. Among his ideas were:
Rituals can be safely ignored, as long as one experiences a true spiritual conversion.
The qualification for ministry is given by the Holy Spirit, not by ecclesiastical study. This implies that anyone has the right to minister, assuming the Spirit guides them, including women and children.
God "dwelleth in the hearts of his obedient people": religious experience is not confined to a church building. Indeed, Fox refused to apply the word "church" to a building, using instead the name "steeple-house", a usage maintained by many Quakers today. Fox would just as soon worship in fields and orchards, believing that God's presence could be felt anywhere.
Though Fox used the Bible to support his views, Fox reasoned that, because God was within the faithful, believers could follow their own inner guide rather than rely on a strict reading of Scripture or the word of clerics.
Fox also made no clear distinction between Father, Son and Holy Spirit.

Religious Society of Friends
In 1647 Fox began to preach publicly: in market-places, fields, appointed meetings of various kinds or even sometimes in "steeple-houses" (churches) after the service. His powerful preaching began to attract a small following. It is not clear at what point the Society of Friends was formed, but there was certainly a group of people who often travelled together. At first, they called themselves "Children of the Light" or "Friends of the Truth", and later simply "Friends". Fox seems initially to have had no desire to found a sect, but only to proclaim what he saw as the pure and genuine principles of Christianity in their original simplicity, though he afterward showed great prowess as a religious organiser in the structure he gave to the new society.

There were a great many rival Christian denominations holding very diverse opinions in that period; the atmosphere of dispute and confusion gave Fox an opportunity to put forward his own beliefs through his personal sermons. Fox's preaching was grounded in scripture but was mainly effective because of the intense personal experience he was able to project. He was scathing about immorality, deceit and the exacting of tithes and urged his listeners to lead lives without sin, avoiding the Ranter's antinomian view that a believer becomes automatically sinless. By 1651 he had gathered other talented preachers around him and continued to roam the country despite a harsh reception from some listeners, who would whip and beat them to drive them away. As his reputation spread, his words were not welcomed by all. As an uncompromising preacher, he hurled disputation and contradiction to the faces of his opponents. The worship of Friends in the form of silent waiting punctuated by individuals speaking as the Spirit moved them seems to have been well-established by this time, though it is not recorded how this came to be; Richard Bauman asserts that "speaking was an important feature of the meeting for worship from the earliest days of Quakerism."

Imprisonment
Fox complained to judges about decisions he considered morally wrong, as he did in a letter on the case of a woman due to be executed for theft. He campaigned against paying the tithes intended to fund the established church, which often went into the pockets of absentee landlords or religious colleges distant from the paying parishioners. In his view, as God was everywhere and anyone could preach, the established church was unnecessary and a university qualification irrelevant for a preacher. Conflict with civil authority was inevitable. Fox was imprisoned several times, the first at Nottingham in 1649. At Derby in 1650 he was imprisoned for blasphemy; a judge mocked Fox's exhortation to "tremble at the word of the Lord", calling him and his followers "Quakers". After he refused to fight against the return of the monarchy (or to take up arms for any reason), his sentence was doubled. The refusal to swear oaths or take up arms came to be much more important in his public statements. Refusal to take oaths meant that Quakers could be prosecuted under laws compelling subjects to pledge allegiance and made testifying in court problematic. In a letter of 1652 (That which is set up by the sword), he urged Friends not to use "carnal weapons" but "spiritual weapons", saying, "let the waves [the power of nations] break over your heads".

In 1652, Fox preached for several hours under a walnut tree at Balby, where his disciple Thomas Aldham was instrumental in setting up the first meeting in the Doncaster area. In the same year Fox felt that God led him to ascend Pendle Hill, where he had a vision of many souls coming to Christ. From there he travelled to Sedbergh, where he had heard a group of Seekers was meeting, and preached to over a thousand people on Firbank Fell, convincing many, including Francis Howgill, to accept that Christ might speak to people directly. At the end of the month he stayed at Swarthmoor Hall, near Ulverston, the home of Thomas Fell, vice-chancellor of the Duchy of Lancaster, and his wife, Margaret. Around that time, the ad hoc meetings of Friends began to be formalised and a monthly meeting was set up in County Durham. Margaret became a Quaker, and although Thomas did not convert, his familiarity with the Friends proved influential when Fox was arrested for blasphemy in October. Fell was one of three presiding judges, and the charges were dismissed on a technicality.

Fox remained at Swarthmoor until the summer of 1653, then left for Carlisle, where he was arrested again for blasphemy. It was even proposed to put him to death, but Parliament requested his release rather than have "a young man ... die for religion". Further imprisonments came in London in 1654, Launceston in 1656, Lancaster in 1660, Leicester in 1662, Lancaster again and Scarborough in 1664–1666 and Worcester in 1673–1675. Charges usually included causing a disturbance and travelling without a pass. Quakers fell foul of irregularly enforced laws forbidding unauthorised worship, while actions motivated by belief in social equality – refusing to use or acknowledge titles, take hats off in court or bow to those who considered themselves socially superior – were seen as disrespectful. While imprisoned at Launceston, Fox wrote, "Christ our Lord and master saith 'Swear not at all, but let your communications be yea, yea, and nay, nay, for whatsoever is more than these cometh of evil.' ... the Apostle James saith, 'My brethren, above all things swear not, neither by heaven, nor by earth, nor by any other oath. Lest ye fall into condemnation.'"

In prison George Fox continued writing and preaching, feeling that imprisonment brought him into contact with people who needed his help—the jailers as well as his fellow prisoners. In his journal, he told his magistrate, "God dwells not in temples made with hands." He also sought to set an example by his actions there, turning the other cheek when being beaten and refusing to show his captors any dejected feelings.

Encounters with Cromwell

Parliamentarians grew suspicious of monarchist plots and fearful that the group travelling with Fox aimed to overthrow the government: by this time his meetings were regularly attracting crowds of over a thousand. In early 1655 he was arrested at Whetstone, Leicestershire and taken to London under armed guard. In March he was brought before the Lord Protector, Oliver Cromwell. After affirming that he had no intention of taking up arms, Fox was able to speak to Cromwell for most of the morning about the Friends. He advised him to listen to God's voice and obey it, so that as Fox left, Cromwell "with tears in his eyes said, 'Come again to my house; for if thou and I were but an hour of a day together, we should be nearer one to the other'; adding that he wished [Fox] no more ill than he did to his own soul."

This episode was later recalled as an example of "speaking truth to power", a preaching technique by which subsequent Quakers hoped to influence the powerful. Although not used until the 20th century, the phrase is related to the ideas of plain speech and simplicity which Fox practised, but motivated by the more worldly goal of eradicating war, injustice and oppression.

Fox petitioned Cromwell over the course of 1656 to alleviate the persecution of Quakers. Later that year, they met for a second time at Whitehall. On a personal level, the meeting went well; despite disagreements between the two men, they had a certain rapport. Fox invited Cromwell to "lay down his crown at the feet of Jesus" – which Cromwell declined to do. Fox met Cromwell again twice in March 1657. Their last meeting was in 1658 at Hampton Court, though they could not speak for long or meet again because of the Protector's worsening illness – Fox even wrote that "he looked like a dead man". Cromwell died in September of that year.

James Nayler
One early Quaker convert, the Yorkshireman James Nayler, arose as a prominent preacher in London around 1655. A breach began to form between Fox's and Nayler's followers. As Fox was held prisoner at Launceston, Nayler moved south-westwards towards Launceston intending to meet Fox and heal any rift. On the way he was arrested himself and held at Exeter. After Fox was released from Launceston gaol in 1656, he preached throughout the West Country. Arriving at Exeter late in September, Fox was reunited with Nayler. Nayler and his followers refused to remove their hats while Fox prayed, which Fox took as both a personal slight and a bad example. When Nayler refused to kiss Fox's hand, Fox told Nayler to kiss his foot instead. Nayler was offended and the two parted acrimoniously. Fox wrote that "there was now a wicked spirit risen amongst Friends".

After Nayler's own release later the same year he rode into Bristol triumphantly playing the part of Jesus Christ in a re-enactment of Palm Sunday. He was arrested and taken to London, where Parliament defeated a motion to execute him by 96–82. Instead, they ordered that he be pilloried and whipped through both London and Bristol, branded on his forehead with the letter B (for blasphemer), bored through the tongue with a red-hot iron and imprisoned in solitary confinement with hard labour. Nayler was released in 1659, but he was a broken man. On meeting Fox in London, he fell to his knees and begged Fox's forgiveness. Shortly afterward, Nayler was attacked by thieves while travelling home to his family, and died.

Suffering and growth

The persecutions of these years – with about a thousand Friends in prison by 1657 – hardened Fox's opinions of traditional religious and social practices. In his preaching, he often emphasised the Quaker rejection of baptism by water; this was a useful way of highlighting how the focus of Friends on inward transformation differed from what he saw as the superstition of outward ritual. It was also a deliberate provocation of adherents of those practices, so providing opportunities for Fox to argue with them on matters of scripture. The same pattern appeared in his court appearances: when a judge challenged him to remove his hat, Fox replied by asking where in the Bible such an injunction could be found.

The Society of Friends became increasingly organised towards the end of the decade. Large meetings were held, including a three-day event in Bedfordshire, the precursor of the present Britain Yearly Meeting system. Fox commissioned two Friends to travel around the country collecting the testimonies of imprisoned Quakers, as evidence of their persecution; this led to the establishment in 1675 of Meeting for Sufferings, which has continued to the present day.

The 1650s, when the Friends were at their most confrontational, was one of the most creative periods of their history. Under the Commonwealth, Fox had hoped that the movement would become the major church in England. Disagreements, persecution and increasing social turmoil, however, led Fox to suffer from severe depression, which left him deeply troubled at Reading, Berkshire, for ten weeks in 1658 or 1659. In 1659, he sent parliament his most politically radical pamphlet, Fifty nine Particulars laid down for the Regulating things, but the year was so chaotic that it never considered these; the document was not reprinted until the 21st century.

The Restoration
With the restoration of the monarchy, Fox's dreams of establishing the Friends as the dominant religion seemed at an end. He was again accused of conspiracy, this time against Charles II, and fanaticism – a charge he resented. He was imprisoned in Lancaster for five months, during which he wrote to the king offering advice on governance: Charles should refrain from war and domestic religious persecution, and discourage oath-taking, plays, and maypole games. These last suggestions reveal Fox's Puritan leanings, which continued to influence Quakers for centuries after his death. Once again, Fox was released after demonstrating that he had no military ambitions.

At least on one point, Charles listened to Fox. The 700 Quakers who had been imprisoned under Richard Cromwell were released, though the government remained uncertain about the group's links with other, more violent, movements. A revolt by the Fifth Monarchists in January 1661 led to the suppression of that sect and the repression of other Nonconformists, including Quakers. In the aftermath of this attempted coup, Fox and eleven other Quakers issued a broadside proclaiming what became known among Friends in the 20th century as the "peace testimony", committing themselves to oppose all outward wars and strife as contrary to the will of God. Not all his followers accepted this commitment; Isaac Penington, for example, dissented for a time, arguing that the state had a duty to protect the innocent from evil, if necessary by using military force. Despite the testimony, persecution against Quakers and other dissenters continued.

Penington and others such as John Perrot and John Pennyman were uneasy at Fox's increasing power within the movement. Like Nayler before them, they saw no reason why men should remove their hats for prayer, arguing that men and women should be treated as equals, and if, as according to the apostle Paul, women should cover their heads, then so could men. Perrot and Penington lost the argument. Perrot emigrated to the New World, and Fox retained leadership of the movement.

Parliament enacted laws which forbade non-Anglican religious meetings of more than five people, essentially making Quaker meetings illegal. Fox counselled his followers to violate openly laws that attempted to suppress the movement, and many Friends, including women and children, were jailed over the next quarter-century. Meanwhile, Quakers in New England had been banished (and some executed), and Charles was advised by his councillors to issue a mandamus condemning this practice and allowing them to return. Fox was able to meet some of the New England Friends when they came to London, stimulating his interest in the colonies. Fox was unable to travel there immediately: he was imprisoned again in 1664 for his refusal to swear the oath of allegiance, and on his release in 1666 was preoccupied with organizational matters — he normalised the system of monthly and quarterly meetings throughout the country, and extended it to Ireland.

Visiting Ireland also gave him a chance to preach against what he saw as the excesses of the Roman Catholic Church, in particular the use of ritual. More recent Quaker commentators have noted points of contact between the denominations: both claim the actual presence of God in their meetings, and both allow the collective opinion of the church to augment Biblical teaching. Fox, however, did not perceive this, brought up as he had been in a wholly Protestant environment hostile to "Popery".

Fox married Margaret Fell of Swarthmoor Hall, a lady of high social position and one of his early converts, on 27 October 1669 at a meeting in Bristol. She was ten years his senior and had eight children (all but one of them Quakers) by her first husband, Thomas Fell, who had died in 1658. She was herself very active in the movement, and had campaigned for equality and the acceptance of women as preachers. As there were no priests at Quaker weddings to perform the ceremony, the union took the form of a civil marriage approved by the principals and the witnesses at a meeting. Ten days after the marriage, Margaret returned to Swarthmoor to continue her work there, while George went back to London. Their shared religious work was at the heart of their life together, and they later collaborated on much of the administration the Society required. Shortly after the marriage, Margaret was imprisoned in Lancaster; George remained in the south-east of England, becoming so ill and depressed that for a time he lost his sight.

Travels in North America and Europe

By 1671 Fox had recovered and Margaret had been released by order of the King. Fox resolved to visit the English settlements in North America and the West Indies, remaining there for two years, possibly to counter any remnants of Perrot's teaching there. After a voyage of seven weeks, during which dolphins were caught and eaten, the party arrived in Barbados on 3 October 1671. From there, Fox sent an epistle to Friends spelling out the role of women's meetings in the Quaker marriage ceremony, a point of controversy when he returned home. One of his proposals suggested that the prospective couple should be interviewed by an all-female meeting prior to the marriage to determine whether there were any financial or other impediments. Though women's meetings had been held in London for the last ten years, this was an innovation in Bristol and the north-west of England, which many there felt went too far.

Fox wrote a letter to the governor and assembly of the island in which he refuted charges that Quakers were stirring up the slaves to revolt and tried to affirm the orthodoxy of Quaker beliefs. After a stay in Jamaica, Fox's first landfall on the North American continent was at Maryland, where he participated in a four-day meeting of local Quakers. He remained there while various of his English companions travelled to the other colonies, because he wished to meet some Native Americans who were interested in Quaker ways—though he relates that they had "a great dispute" among themselves about whether to participate in the meeting. Fox was impressed by their general demeanour, which he saw as "courteous and loving". He resented the suggestion (from a man in North Carolina) that "the Light and Spirit of God ... was not in the Indians", a proposition which Fox rejected. Fox left no record of encountering slaves on the mainland.

Elsewhere in the colonies, Fox helped to establish organizational systems for the Friends, along the same lines as he had done in Britain. He also preached to many non-Quakers, some but not all of whom were converted.

After extensive travels round the various American colonies, George Fox returned to England in June 1673 confident that his movement was firmly established there. Back in England, however, he found his movement sharply divided among provincial Friends (such as William Rogers, John Wilkinson and John Story) who resisted establishment of women's meetings and the power of those who resided in or near London. With William Penn and Robert Barclay as allies of Fox, the challenge to Fox's leadership was eventually put down. But in the midst of the dispute, Fox was imprisoned again for refusing to swear oaths after being captured at Armscote, Worcestershire. His mother died shortly after hearing of his arrest and Fox's health began to suffer. Margaret Fell petitioned the king for his release, which was granted, but Fox felt too weak to take up his travels immediately. Recuperating at Swarthmoor, he began dictating what would be published after his death as his journal and devoted his time to his written output: letters, both public and private, as well as books and essays. Much of his energy was devoted to the topic of oaths, having become convinced of its importance to Quaker ideas. By refusing to swear, he felt that he could bear witness to the value of truth in everyday life, as well as to God, whom he associated with truth and the inner light.

For three months in 1677 and a month in 1684, Fox visited the Friends in the Netherlands, and organised their meetings for discipline. The first trip was the more extensive, taking him into what is now Germany, proceeding along the coast to Friedrichstadt and back again over several days. Meanwhile, Fox was participating in a dispute among Friends in Britain over the role of women in meetings, a struggle which took much of his energy and left him exhausted. Returning to England, he stayed in the south to try to end the dispute. Persecution continued, with Fox arrested briefly in October 1683. Fox's health was worsening, but he continued his activities – writing to leaders in Poland, Denmark, Germany and elsewhere about his beliefs and their treatment of Quakers.

Last years

In the last years of his life, Fox continued to participate in the London Meetings, and still made representations to Parliament about the sufferings of Friends. The new King, James II, pardoned religious dissenters jailed for failure to attend the established church, leading to the release of about 1,500 Friends. Though the Quakers lost influence after the Glorious Revolution, which deposed James II, the Act of Toleration 1689 put an end to the uniformity laws under which Quakers had been persecuted, permitting them to assemble freely.

Two days after preaching as usual at the Gracechurch Street Meeting House in London, George Fox died between 9 and 10 p.m. on 13 January 1690 O.S. (23 January 1691 N.S.). He was interred three days later in the Quaker Burying Ground, in the presence of thousands of mourners.

Book of Miracles
George Fox performed hundreds of healings throughout his preaching ministry, the records of which were collected in a notable but now lost book titled Book of Miracles. This book was listed in the catalogue of George Fox’s work maintained by the Friends Library in Friends House, London. In 1932, Henry Cadbury found a reference to Book of Miracles in the catalogue, which included the beginning and ending of each account of a miraculous cure. The book was then reconstructed based on this resource and journal accounts. According to Rufus M. Jones, the Book of Miracles "makes it possible for us to follow George Fox as he went about his seventeenth-century world, not only preaching his fresh messages of life and power, but as a remarkable healer of disease with the undoubted reputation of miracle-worker." The Book of Miracles was deliberately suppressed in favour of printing Fox's Journal and other writings.

A sample from Book of Miracles: "And a young woman her mother ... had made her well. And another young woman was ... small pox ... of God was made well."

Journal and letters
Fox's journal was first published in 1694, after editing by Thomas Ellwood – a friend and associate of John Milton – with a preface by William Penn. Like most similar works of its time the journal was not written contemporaneously to the events it describes, but rather compiled many years later, much of it dictated. Parts of the journal were not in fact by Fox at all, but constructed by its editors from diverse sources and written as if by him. The dissent within the movement and the contributions of others to the development of Quakerism are largely excluded from the narrative. Fox portrays himself as always in the right and always vindicated by God's interventions on his behalf. As a religious autobiography, Rufus Jones compared it to such works as Augustine's Confessions and John Bunyan's Grace Abounding to the Chief of Sinners. It is, though, an intensely personal work with little dramatic power that only succeeds in appealing to readers after substantial editing. Historians have used it as a primary source because of its wealth of detail on ordinary life in the 17th century, and the many towns and villages which Fox visited.

Hundreds of Fox's letters – mostly intended for wide circulation, along with a few private communications – were also published. Written from the 1650s onwards, with such titles as Friends, seek the peace of all men or To Friends, to know one another in the light, they give enormous insight into the detail of Fox's beliefs and show his determination to spread them. These writings, in the words of Henry Cadbury, Professor of Divinity at Harvard University and a prominent Quaker, "contain a few fresh phrases of his own, [but] are generally characterized by an excess of scriptural language and today they seem dull and repetitious". Others point out that "Fox's sermons, rich in biblical metaphor and common speech, brought hope in a dark time." Fox's aphorisms found an audience beyond the Quakers, with many other church groups using them to illustrate principles of Christianity.

Fox is described by Ellwood as "graceful in countenance, manly in personage, grave in gesture, courteous in conversation". Penn says he was "civil beyond all forms of breeding". We are told that he was "plain and powerful in preaching, fervent in prayer", "a discerner of other men's spirits, and very much master of his own", skilful to "speak a word in due season to the conditions and capacities of most, especially to them that were weary, and wanted soul's rest"; "valiant in asserting the truth, bold in defending it, patient in suffering for it, immovable as a rock".

Legacy
Fox had a tremendous influence on the Society of Friends and his beliefs have largely been carried forward. Perhaps his most significant achievement, other than his predominant influence in the early movement, was his leadership in overcoming the twin challenges of government prosecution after the Restoration and internal disputes that threatened its stability during the same period. Not all of his beliefs were welcome to all Quakers: his Puritan-like opposition to the arts and rejection of theological study, forestalled development of these practices among Quakers for some time. The George Fox room at Friends House, London, UK is named after him.

Walt Whitman, who was raised by parents inspired by Quaker principles, later wrote: "George Fox stands for something too – a thought – the thought that wakes in silent hours – perhaps the deepest, most eternal thought latent in the human soul. This is the thought of God, merged in the thoughts of moral right and the immortality of identity. Great, great is this thought – aye, greater than all else."

George is remembered in the Church of England with a commemoration on 13 January.

See also
Christian anarchism
Christian mysticism
George Fox University
List of abolitionist forerunners
List of people on stamps of Ireland
Anthony Sharp (Quaker), Dublin Quaker and merchant

References

Primary sources

Various editions of Fox's journal have been published since the first printing in 1694:

Jones, Rufus M. (editor). 1908. George Fox – An Autobiography, an annotated and slightly abridged text, is also available in print (e. g. Friends United Press, 2006) and online.
Nickalls, John L. (editor). 1952. The Journal of George Fox. Cambridge University Press. (Reprinted by the Philadelphia Yearly Meeting)
Ross, Hugh McGregor (editor). 2008. George Fox: A Christian Mystic. Cathair na Mart: Evertype.

Secondary sources

Barclay, Robert (1678), An Apology for the True Christian Divinity. A systematic treatment of Quaker theology at the end of the seventeenth century; available online.
Bauman, Richard (1983), Let your words be few. (Cambridge: CUP). A survey of the role of words, language, silence and symbolism among seventeenth century Quakers.
Emerson, Wildes Harry (1965), Voice of the Lord: A Biography of George Fox (Philadelphia: University of Pennsylvania Press).
Ingle, H. Larry (1994, reprinted 1996), First Among Friends: George Fox and the Creation of Quakerism (Oxford University Press). First scholarly biography showing how Fox used his influence in the Society of Friends to ensure conformity to his views and survival of the group.
Ingle, H. Larry (2004), "Fox, George (1624–1691)". Oxford Dictionary of National Biography (Oxford University Press). Retrieved 13 May 2008.  (Subscription required)
Marsh, Josiah (1847), A Popular Life of George Fox (London: Charles Gilpin). Somewhat biased but thorough biography of Fox.
Mullett, Michael (1994), New Light on George Fox, 1624-91: A Collection of Essays (York: Ebor Press/Hyperion Books). Collection of essays.
Quaker Faith and Practice, Yearly Meeting of the Religious Society of Friends (Quakers) in Britain. ( [1999 revision]). Shows a modern Quaker view of Fox and much historical information about Friends and their institutions.

External links

The life's work of George Fox @ Ward's Book of Days
The Writings and Life of George Fox. The Journal and the Epistles, edited and with commentary by Hall Worthington and Joan Worthington
The Lamb's Officer is Gone Forth with the Lamb's Message by George Fox at the Ex-Classics Web Site
House of Commons Journal Volume 8, 21 May 1660, see entry under Geo. Fox, &c., Order by the House that George Fox & Rob. Gressingham who "made a great Disturbance at Harwich" and are to be handed over to the Serjeant-at-Arms.

1624 births
1691 deaths
17th-century Christian clergy
17th-century English writers
17th-century English male writers
17th-century Christian mystics
Burials at Bunhill Fields
English Dissenters
English evangelicals
English Christian pacifists
English Christian religious leaders
English Christian theologians
English religious leaders
English religious writers
English Quakers
Quaker writers
Lay theologians
People convicted of blasphemy
People from Hinckley and Bosworth (district)
Protestant mystics
Quaker ministers
Quaker theologians
17th-century English theologians
17th-century Quakers
Christian radicals
Shoemakers
Founders of religions
Anglican saints